The men's pole vault event at the 2009 European Athletics U23 Championships was held in Kaunas, Lithuania, at S. Dariaus ir S. Girėno stadionas (Darius and Girėnas Stadium) on 17 and 19 July.

Medalists

Results

Final
19 July

Qualifications
17 July
Qualifying perf. 5.40 or 12 to the Final

Group A

Group B

Participation
According to an unofficial count, 21 athletes from 13 countries participated in the event.

 (1)
 (1)
 (1)
 (3)
 (2)
 (2)
 (2)
 (2)
 (1)
 (1)
 (3)
 (1)
 (1)

References

Pole vault
Pole vault at the European Athletics U23 Championships